Samatali, Xamatari, Tsanuma, Chirichano, and Guaika are alternative names for:
 Sanuma people, an ethnic group of Venezuela and Brazil
 Sanuma language, a language of Venezuela and Brazil

Language and nationality disambiguation pages